Without Kuryokhin is a 1999 album by American jazz multi-instrumentalist Kenny Millions and Japanese experimental musician Otomo Yoshihide. It was dedicated to Russian jazz and experimental musician Sergey Kuryokhin. It was recorded live during a Russian mini-tour in 1996 and performed two concerts, one at Moscow, and one at Saint Petersburg.

Track listing
All tracks written by Kenny Millions and Otomo Yoshihide.
"Live & Remix 1" - 9:04
"Live 1" - 3:31
"Live & Remix 2" - 0:53
"Live & Remix 3" - 6:03
"Live & Remix 4" - 3:57
"Live 2" - 21:59
"Live & Remix 5" - 3:59

Personnel
Kenny Millions - saxophone, clarinet, miniature guitar, vocals
Otomo Yoshihide - turntables, electronics, samplers

External links
History of the album — in Russian.

1999 live albums
Noise music albums by American artists